Emily Benedek is an American journalist and author. She is a graduate of Harvard College.

She has written for Newsweek, The New York Times, National Public Radio, The Washington Post, Rolling Stone, and Glamour, among others. She writes regularly for Tablet magazine.

To research her novel, Red Sea, Benedek followed an FBI special agent working counterterrorism for a year. She has spent hundreds of hours interviewing foreign covert operators and wrote about an American F-15c fighter pilot. She has reported multiple stories about computer hackers.

Books
 The Wind Won't Know Me: A History of Navajo–Hopi Land Dispute (Knopf, 1992; University of Oklahoma Press, 1999)
 Beyond the Four Corners of the World: A Navajo Woman's Journey (Knopf, August 22, 1995)
 Through the Unknown, Remembered Gate: A Spiritual Journey (Shocken Books/Random House of Canada, April 3, 2001)
 Red Sea (novel) (St Martins Press, September 18, 2007)
 "Beggar's Opera" (novel) "Saat der Angst," (Goldmann Verlag), March 17, 2014

References

Harvard College alumni
Living people
American women novelists
American women journalists
Year of birth missing (living people)
20th-century American women writers
21st-century American women writers
20th-century American journalists
21st-century American journalists
21st-century American novelists